Slavonski Brod, commonly shortened to simply Brod, is a city in eastern Croatia, near the border with Bosnia and Herzegovina. Being one of the principal cities in the historical regions of Slavonia and Posavina, Slavonski Brod was the 7th largest city in the country, with a population of 59,141 at the 2011 census. It is the centre of Brod-Posavina County and a major river port on the Sava river.

Names
Although brod means 'ship' in modern Croatian, the city's name bears witness to an older meaning - 'water crossing', 'ford'.

Among the names historically in use: Marsonia in the Roman Empire, Brood (in Slawonien) in the German speaking Austrian period, Brod na Savi after 1934.

The ancient name "Marsonia" probably comes from the Proto-Indo-European word *mory (marsh), and the same root is seen in the nearby toponyms such as "Mursa" and "Mariniana".

Geography

It developed at the strategically important crossing over the Sava river toward Brod in Bosnia and Herzegovina. The Bosnian city was called Bosanski Brod until 2009.

Slavonski Brod is an important intersection of the Posavina part of the highway and a railway junction, since it is located on the highway linking Zagreb–Lipovac–Belgrade (E70, A3) and the Zagreb–Vinkovci–Belgrade railway. The ship port "Brod" on the Sava river is under construction.

There is also a new modern highway under construction, on the Pan-European Corridor Vc, which will connect Northern Europe and Hungary with Croatia (through the region of Slavonia), and Bosnia and Herzegovina with Croatia (through the coastal region of Dalmatia). The alignment of this highway is approximately at a  distance from the center of the town. With the completion of this route, the area of the town Slavonski Brod will become one of the major highway intersections in this part of Europe connecting directions west–east and north–south.

Demographics

Slavonski Brod is the sixth largest city in Croatia, after Zagreb, Split, Rijeka, Osijek and Zadar.

Brod is the center of a built-up area of more than 110,000 inhabitants including Brod in Bosnia, Sibinj, Bukovlje, Brodski Stupnik, Podcrkavlje, Gornja Vrba and Klakar.

The following settlements comprise the administrative area of Slavonski Brod:
 Brodski Varoš, population 2,035
 Podvinje, population 3,575
 Slavonski Brod, population 53,531

History
A favorable geographical location, pleasant continental climate, fertile soil and being in the vicinity of the river Sava have all resulted with the city being inhabited since a prehistoric age.

Prehistory 

The northeastern part of the city, at Galovo, recently revealed a rich deposit of the Starčevo culture, dating in the Early Stone Age. Besides the fact that this is the largest architectural finding in northern Croatia, it proves that the locality of Brod has been inhabited for at least 8,000 years.

Roman period 
The first historical settlement in Brod dates from Roman times, the settlement being known as Marsonia. It is still disputed whether Marsonia was a postal station, lodging for the night or an actual settlement.

The Peutinger map refers to Marsonia as Marsonie, while the work "Notitia Dignitatum" has Marsonia under the name of "Auxilia Ascaria Tauruno sive Marsonia". The issue of Marsonia becoming a city has been tackled by the publishers of Ptolemy's geography, dating from the 16th century. The first geographer who located the position of Marsonia at the locality of Brod was Abraham Ortelius, who, in his atlas Theatrum orbis terrarum (Antwerp 1590) published a map, the objective of which was to reconstruct and connect the antic names of Panonian and Illyric settlements with the towns of that time. It was he who placed Marsonia at today's location of Brod.

Peutinger's table clearly shows that Marsonia initially existed next to the Sava river, at the place where the Roman road crossed the river. The first Croatian expert, claiming that the Roman MARSVNNIA was located where Brod is now is Matija Petar Katančić, giving this assertion additional support.

Before the Yugoslav breakup 
The Slavs settled in the area of the city in the 6th century. The name of the town is mentioned for the first time in Bela IV of Hungary's charter, dated 1224. The Vukovac fortress was built in the 15th century, subsequently damaged by the Turks. The Ottoman Empire controlled the settlement from 1536 until 1691, when it was ceded to the Empire of Austria, as confirmed by the Treaty of Karlowitz in 1699. Until 1918, Brod (named Brood before 1850) remained in the Austrian monarchy (Kingdom of Croatia-Slavonia after the compromise of 1867), in the Slavonian Military Frontier, under the administration of the Brooder Grenz-Infanterie-Regiment N°VII until 1881. A huge Vauban type fortress was built east of Vukovac.

Alongside its defence role the city saw steady development of crafts and commerce. The education and culture were strongly dominated by the Franciscans. The 20th century was a period of strong economic growth of the city, with the 1920s being called "the Golden Age of Brod". The city's current name dates from 1934 when it was changed from Brod na Savi.

From 1941 to 1945 the city was part of the Independent State of Croatia. The town was heavily bombed by the Allies in 1944 and 1945. The bombing resulted in damage to 80% of the buildings in Slavonski Brod. The bombing resulted in 897 civilian deaths, 244 military deaths, 208 wounded civilians, and 28 military wounded in Slavonski Brod and Bosanski Brod.

In 1990 democratic reforms legalised the formation of political parties other than the League of Communists of Croatia. In Slavonski Brod, the first parties formed were the Croatian Democratic Union and the Croatian Democratic Party.

Economy

The city's economy is based on farming, viticulture, fruit growing, metal-processing, timber (furniture wood, parquetry), textiles (ready-made), leather, foodstuffs (brewery), building material (lime), and printing industries.

Slavonski Brod is also home to some of the most important metal companies in Southeastern Europe, the Djuro Djakovic consortium, consisting of a number of factories producing very diverse products, mainly for export. The consortium is capable of producing: locomotives, tramways, wagons, bridges, industrial plants, nuclear reactors, car parts, heavily armed vehicles, armoured fighting vehicles, including main battle tanks and mine warfare vehicles, agricultural machinery, etc.

Service industries are becoming rapidly important, especially tourism. The city has an important cultural heritage, including a fortress and a Franciscan monastery with a rich library.

Cultural heritage

The Brod Fortress from the Baroque period, was constructed during the Austro-Hungarian Empire to serve as a stronghold against the Ottoman Empire, which was situated on the other bank of the Sava river. It is in the Vauban style, named after one of the best European experts in the building of fortifications in 17th and 18th centuries. It is one of Europe's best preserved fortresses, and also one of the biggest on the former Austro-Hungarian Military Frontier. In a way, it is the continental obverse of Diocletian's Palace in Split, by its monumentality.

The city's Franciscan monastery dates from the 18th century, and is also Baroque in style, with exceptional architecture, especially of the church yard, and monastery church interior, with its beautiful altar and paintings. In 1720, a faculty of philosophy was opened here.

The most important annual cultural event in the town is the children's festival 'In the World of the Fairy Tales of Writer Ivana Brlić-Mažuranić', in April and May. The Brodsko kolo, an annual show of original folklore, is held in mid-June, while the Festival of Patriotic Folk Songs takes place in May. The artistic 'Sava' colony  cherishes the tradition of watercolour painting.

One of the attractions of Slavonski Brod is a beautiful central town square, one of the two or three biggest in all of Croatia, Ivana Brlić-Mažuranić square, named after a popular children's writer, whose house is on the square. This square is also home to numerous cultural events and has a perfect view of the beautiful Sava river. The square is also dotted with galleries, book stores, cafes, night clubs, and shops, making it a center for entertainment. Close to the square, another attraction is the romantic promenade next to the Sava river - 'Kej' as it is called by citizens of town.

Slavonski Brod Synagogue, destroyed during World War II, was among the largest and most prestigious synagogues in Croatia.

Slavonski Brod is home to monuments to bishop Josip Stadler and Croatia's first president Franjo Tuđman. Slavonski Brod and its rail station are featured in Agatha Christie's Murder on the Orient Express as the place near which the Orient Express train breaks down.

Education
Slavonski Brod has very well developed educational institutions in pre-school, primary, secondary and higher education.

The city also hosts the University of Slavonski Brod, and the Primary School Teacher Training College. Some other faculties are expected to be opened soon.
In October 2006. an associate-degree college has been founded with several other faculties.

Transportation 
Slavonski Brod has a train station on M104 railway corridor - it serves as a stop for all trains on international routes which passes through the town (such as Vinkovci - Villach or Zagreb - Belgrade), also being directly connected by a large number of domestic local and limited-stop services running between the capital city of Zagreb and Vinkovci/(Tovarnik, state border with Serbia).

By regular bus lines from various companies, Slavonski Brod bus station is well connected with the surrounding villages, municipalities and cities in Slavonia, such as: Đakovo, Požega and Nova Gradiška, as well as with all major cities throughout Croatia: Pula, Rijeka, Umag, Poreč, Rovinj, Osijek, Zagreb, Karlovac, Zadar, Split, Šibenik, etc. From the international lines there are regular departures in the direction of Germany and Switzerland.

Surroundings

In the immediate surroundings of the town there are interesting hunting grounds (Migalovci), fishponds (Jelas Polje), and a lake (Petnja). There are pleasant orchards and vineyards, Dilj mountain (or 'Dilj Gora'), and swimming opportunities.

Climate
Slavonski Brod has a warm-summer humid continental climate (Köppen climate classification Dfb).

International relations

Twin towns — Sister cities
Slavonski Brod is twinned with:

  Celje, Slovenia

See also
 List of people from Slavonski Brod
 Petnja

References

Bibliography

Notes

External links

 Slavonski Brod, city government
 Festung Brod (Fortress Brod)

 
Cities and towns in Croatia
Slavonia
Požega County
Bosnia and Herzegovina–Croatia border crossings
Populated places in Brod-Posavina County
13th-century establishments in Croatia
1224 establishments in Europe
Divided cities
Starčevo–Körös–Criș culture